The 1992–93 Croatian Ice Hockey League season was the second season of the Croatian Ice Hockey League, the top level of ice hockey in Croatia. Four teams participated in the league, Zagreb making championship.

Regular season

Play-offs

3rd place
 Medveščak – Sisak 3:0 (15:3, 8:5, 15:2)

Final
Zagreb – Mladost 3:0 (8:0, 9:1, 12:0)

External links
Season on hockeyarchives.info

Croatian Ice Hockey League
1
Croatian Ice Hockey League seasons